Shaqtin' a Fool is a weekly segment from the television show Inside the NBA, the postgame show of NBA on TNT following the conclusion of National Basketball Association (NBA) games airing on cable TV channel TNT. The title is a play on "actin' a fool." It first aired during the 2011–12 NBA season, when retired NBA All-Star Shaquille O'Neal voiced it upon joining the show and was created by Turner Sports producer Mike Goldfarb. Shaqtin' highlights humorous and uncommon basketball plays that have occurred during NBA games in the past week. O'Neal is the host and presenter, while the other analysts in studio react and provide commentary. Most often, those have been fellow Inside regulars Ernie Johnson, Kenny Smith, and Charles Barkley, but other Inside hosts have also participated, including Chris Webber, Grant Hill, Steve Smith, Kevin Garnett and Matt Winer. Since 2018, the Shaqtin franchise has been led by Turner Sports producer Michael Kaplan.

The segment regularly features NBA players and also includes, but is not limited to, coaches, referees, fans, mascots, and other arena employees. Sometimes they also air clips from other international basketball leagues. On special occasions, the segment features plays which had occurred during the past, including several entire "retro" editions. Each episode tends to have four entries (five until 2018) from the past week, with each entry typically involving a single play (although there are some times where a collection of similar bad plays, such as travels and air ball free throws, are highlighted). Multiple plays may include the same player, and a single play may highlight more than one player.

There is a special award given to certain players, called the "Shaqtin Golden Ticket," which is lifetime immunity from being included in the segment. Since its debut in 2015, four players have been awarded with the award. Those include: current New Orleans Pelicans power forward Larry Nance Jr. (2015 winner), current Philadelphia 76ers small and power forward P. J. Tucker (2016 winner, although he was featured on an episode during the 2018–19 season), 2-time Shaqtin’ MVP, 3-time NBA Champion, and current Dallas Mavericks center JaVale McGee (after his long feud with O'Neal escalated in early 2017, see more in "Shaq's feud with JaVale McGee" section), and current Philadelphia 76ers center Joel Embiid (2018 winner, although he did appear in an episode in the 2022-23 season).

At the conclusion of the NBA postseason, a Shaqtin' a Fool special airs on NBA TV. During the special, O'Neal is joined by Ro Parrish and Dennis Scott, and the top Shaqtin' a Fool plays of the season are shown. On the 2013 special, 34 plays were shown to honor O'Neal's jersey retirement of No. 34 during his tenure with the Los Angeles Lakers. On the 2014 special, only 20 plays were shown. For the 2015 special, the number of plays increased to 30. Since the beginning of the 2013–14 NBA season, fans are able to tweet suggestions for Shaqtin' a Fool.

Shaqtin' a Fool Most Valuable Player 

The Shaqtin' a Fool Most Valuable Player (MVP) is an annual award presented at the Shaqtin' a Fool special during the conclusion of the NBA Playoffs. In the 2011–12 and the 2012–13 season, fans voted online for their favorite play of the year, and whichever player whose play accumulated the most votes for that season was awarded with the Shaqtin' a Fool MVP. In the 2013–14 season, the MVP was decided through the most appearances made by one player in a single season. In the event of a tie, fans vote for a player, and the leading candidate receives the award. For the 2014–15 season, three nominees were named and fans voted online for the winner.

Special editions
Other from the season-ending special, occasionally there are other special editions of Shaqtin' a Fool.

All-star edition
Starting with the conclusion of the 2012 All-Star Game, an "All-Star Weekend" edition of Shaqtin' a Fool airs after NBA All-Star Weekend. It highlights bloopers that had occurred in the All Star Weekend events, such as the Slam Dunk Contest, the NBA All-Star Celebrity Game, and the NBA Rising Stars Challenge.

Inside the NBA edition
The April 17th, 2013 edition of Shaqtin''' was devoted to Inside, showing four moments featuring Inside cast members (including two from Charles Barkley), and one from then-Miami Heat power forward/center, Chris Bosh. For example, it included Johnson in a comic dunk contest as "'Elevator' Ernie Johnson".

Shaqtin' a Fool midseason award special
2014
On February 27, 2014, a midseason special named the "Shaqtin's" (parodying the Academy Awards) aired on NBA TV featuring O'Neal, Scott and Greenberg.

2015
For 2015, O'Neal, Scott and Greenberg were joined by Funkmaster Flex, who also presented Flexin' A Fool, reserved for players under 6 feet. Ashanti also made an appearance to put her spin on the intro.

2016
On February 17, 2016, Greenberg hosted the 2016 edition with O'Neal and Scott.

2017
On February 22, 2017, Ro Parrish  hosted the 2017 edition with O'Neal and Scott. In this edition, all winners except Westbrook made an on-camera "acceptance speech" (in Smith's case, Jason Terry, who was also involved in the play, spoke for him). That led to additional plays featured; another windmill dunk by Ross, this time successful (after his asking for it) and two flops O'Neal made during his career (after "Best Actor" winner Marcus Smart accepted the award but implied that O'Neal flopped some times himself as a player).

In addition, O'Neal's mispronouncing of players' names was featured before the Worst Fast Break was presented.

2018
On February 21, 2018, Casey Stern hosted the 2018 edition with O'Neal, Scott and Tony Rock. In this edition, all winners except Stephen Curry and Marcus Smart made an on-camera "acceptance speech" (in Curry's case, Lauri Markkanen, who was also involved in the play, spoke for him). O'Neal spoke on Smart's behalf and also presented a clip of him taking a seven-step travel in a 2010 playoff game.

 2023 
After around 5-year hiatus, Shaqtin' a Fool midseason award was back on February 21, 2023. This edition was hosted by Dennis Scott along with Shaquille O'Neal and Josiah Johnson. This award also presented some of Shaq's viral moments during the 2022-23 season in the final segment.

Notes
 : These moments happened when Russell Westbrook and Patrick Beverley played for the Los Angeles Lakers.
 : This moment happened when D'Angelo Russell played for the Minnesota Timberwolves.

"Old School" Edition (2014)"
On December 11, 2014, a special edition of Shaqtin' a Fool, titled "Old School", featured plays which occurred during the 1980s, 90s, 2000s, and a special section showing O'Neal's top bloopers during his career as a player. This edition ran on NBA TV, and showed 5 plays for each category, totaling to 20 plays.

 [1] Walker was included in the same play as Mills

 [2] Buchert is an NBA referee

Shaq's feud with JaVale McGee
The player who was featured most frequently on the show was JaVale McGee, who "won" MVP honors in the first two seasons and was firstly featured on the second episode of the 2011-2012 season. McGee's growing displeasure over his frequent appearances culminated into a heated argument between him and Shaquille O'Neal on February 24, 2017, with tweets exchanged between the two. During the following show, O'Neal declared that the feud was over and McGee's name would "never come out of his mouth again". During the last show of the 2016-17 regular season, when the best plays of the season were selected, a co-host tried to ask O'Neal if there was a chance that any of McGee's plays already shown at the show before the feud would be featured, but O'Neal immediately dismissed the possibility. Since the feud, McGee's former team, the Golden State Warriors, had requested TNT, the network airing the segment, to cease mentions of McGee.

Javale then explained to Shannon Sharpe on his podcast Club Shay Shay''At the time when it was happening, I wasn't in a position to really speak on it to where it would get any push if I would've spoke on it early on. I didn't realise what it was doing to my career until I started to move onto other teams. It was slowly chipping my reputation. Perception changes everything. All I have been doing is trying to build my reputation back up.

References 

Shaquille O'Neal
National Basketball Association on television
Turner Sports
2011 American television series debuts